The Bulgaria national under-21 football team is considered to be the feeder team for the Bulgaria national football team. This team is for Bulgarian players aged under 21 at the start of the calendar year in which a two-year UEFA European Under-21 Championship campaign begins, so some players can remain with the squad until the age of 23.

Competition results
 Champions   Runners-Up   Semi-Finals   Other Top Results

Balkan Youth Championship

UEFA U-21 European Championship

UEFA Euro 2023 Qualifier

Recent fixtures

Coaching staff

Current coaching staff

Manager history

Current squad

Players 
All caps and goals as of 25 November 2022 after match against .
Players in bold have been called up or have played at least one full international match with national senior team.

Recent call ups
The following players have previously been called up to the Bulgaria under-21 squad and remain eligible.

Notes
A = Not part of the current squad due to being called up to the senior team.
INJ = Not part of the current squad due to injury.
COVID = Withdrawn from the current squad due to suffering from COVID-19.

See also
 Bulgaria national football team
 Bulgaria national under-17 football team
 Bulgaria national under-19 football team
 European Under-21 Football Championship

References

External links
Official website 
 UEFA Under-21 website, complete results archive
 The Rec.Sport.Soccer Statistics Foundation, full record of U-21 and U-23 Championships

European national under-21 association football teams
Under-21
Youth football in Bulgaria